Ariotus luteolus is a species of ant-like leaf beetle in the family Aderidae. It is found in North America.

References

Further reading

 

Aderidae
Articles created by Qbugbot
Beetles described in 1895